SS Grand Zenith was an oil tanker that sank sometime after December 30, 1976 with the loss of all hands.

She was launched as Orion Cometon 28 July 1953 and renamed Flying Comet in 1964, quickly followed by Western Comet the same year, then to Beta Reserve in 1973 before receiving the name Grand Zenith in 1974. At the time of her loss, she was registered in Panama and was owned by Zenith Navigation Corporation.

After she missed her scheduled January 2 arrival in Somerset, Massachusetts, she was reported missing, and a search was begun on January 3 by the United States Coast Guard, which deployed a cutter and helicopter, and the Canadian Coast Guard, which sent a plane.

On January 11, with heavy weather and no further signs of the ship or survivors, the Coast Guard abandoned the search and declared the entire crew lost.

References

Maritime incidents in 1976
Oil tankers
1953 ships